Illimar Truverk (born March 20, 1967, in Tallinn) is an Estonian architect.

Truverk studied at the Estonian Academy of Arts in the department of architecture and city planning, graduating in 2001. Since then he has worked for the architectural bureau Agabus, Endjärv & Truverk OÜ. Truverk has also been active in the architectural bureau Allianss Arhitektid OÜ beginning in 2009.

His notable works include the Viimsi School, the new building of the Tallinn University, the villa in Otepää and the new library of the Tallinn Technical University. Truverk is a member of the Union of Estonian Architects.

Works

Apartment buildings in Pirita, 2003 (with Eero Endjärv, Mattias Agabus)
Villa in Southern Estonia, 2004 (with Eero Endjärv, Mattias Agabus)
Apartment building in Nõmme, 2005 (with Eero Endjärv, Raul Järg, Mattias Agabus)
Apartment building on Kreutzwaldi street in Tallinn, 2005 (with Eero Endjärv, Mattias Agabus)
Apartment building in Viimsi, 2006 (with Eero Endjärv, Raul Järg, Mattias Agabus)
New building of the Tallinn University, 2006 (with Eero Endjärv, Mattias Agabus, Raul Järgi, Priit Pent)
Viimsi school, 2006 (with Eero Endjärv, Mattias Agabus, Priit Pent, Raul Järg)
New library of the Tallinn Technical University, 2009 (with Eero Endjärv, Mattias Agabus)

Competitions
Planning competition for the Tallinn harbour area, 1999; 2. prize
New building of the Tallinn University, 2003; 1. prize
Library of the Tallinn Technical University, 2006, 1. prize

References
Architectural bureau Agabus, Endjärv & Truverk OÜ
Union of Estonian Architects, members

1967 births
Living people
Architects from Tallinn
Estonian Academy of Arts alumni